Dunay-e Sofla (also Romanized as Dūnāy-e Soflá; also known as Dūnā-ye Pā’īn and Dūnā-ye Soflá) is a village in Owzrud Rural District, Baladeh District, Nur County, Mazandaran Province, Iran. At the 2006 census, its population was 502, in 127 families.

References 

Populated places in Nur County